Chaetonotus is a genus of gastrotrichs in the family Chaetonotidae

References